The 1973 Colchester Borough Council election were the first elections to the newly created Colchester Borough Council. They took place on 7 June 1973. This was on the same day as other local elections. The Local Government Act 1972 stipulated that the elected members were to shadow and eventually take over from the predecessor corporation on 1 April 1974.

Summary

|}

Ward results

Birch-Messing

Boxted & Langham

Copford & Eight Ash Green

Dedham

East Donyland

Fordham

Great & Little Horkesley

Marks Tey

No. 1 (Colchester: Berechurch)

No. 2 (Colchester: Castle)

No. 3 (Colchester: Harbour)

No. 4 (Colchester: Lexden)

No. 5 (Colchester: Mile End)

No. 6 (Colchester: New Town)

No. 7 (Colchester: St. John's)

No. 8 (Colchester: St. Mary's)

No. 9 (Colchester: Shrub End)

No. 23 (Tiptree: Church)

No. 24 (Tiptree: Heath)

No. 25 (Tiptree: Maypole)

Pyefleet

Stanway

West Bergholt

West Mersea

Winstree

Wivenhoe

References

Colchester
Colchester Borough Council elections
1970s in Essex